Muhammad Azam (born 14 June 1939) is a Pakistani weightlifter. He competed at the 1960 Summer Olympics and the 1964 Summer Olympics.

References

External links
 

1939 births
Living people
Pakistani male weightlifters
Olympic weightlifters of Pakistan
Weightlifters at the 1960 Summer Olympics
Weightlifters at the 1964 Summer Olympics
Sportspeople from Lahore
20th-century Pakistani people